Skånland is a former municipality that was located in the old Troms county, Norway. The municipality existed from 1926 until its dissolution in 2020 when it was merged into Tjeldsund Municipality. It was part of the Central Hålogaland region, just southeast of the city of Harstad.  The administrative centre of the municipality was the village of Evenskjer.  Other villages included Grovfjord, Renså, Sandstrand, and Tovik.

The Tjeldsund Bridge in Skånland connects the island of Hinnøya (the largest coastal island in Norway) to the Norwegian mainland.

At the time of its dissolution as a municipality on 1 January 2020, the  municipality was the 210th largest by area out of the 422 municipalities in Norway. Skånland was also the 265th most populous municipality in Norway with a population of 2,994.

General information
Skånland was established on 1 July 1926 when the large municipality of Trondenes was divided into three municipalities: Sandtorg (population: 4,224) in the southwest, Skånland (population: 2,443) in the southeast, and Trondenes (population: 3,429) in the north.  During the 1960s, there were many municipal mergers across Norway due to the work of the Schei Committee.  On 1 January 1964, the neighboring municipality of Astafjord (population: 1,120) was merged into Skånland.  On the same date, the part of Skånland on the island of Rolla (population: 143) was transferred to neighboring Ibestad Municipality.

The municipalities of Skånland and Tjeldsund voted to merge on 1 January 2020 to form a new, larger municipality of Tjeldsund.

Name
The municipality (originally the parish) is named after the old Skånland farm since the first Skånland Church was built there in 1870. The first element is the genitive case of an old name for the area. The meaning of this name is uncertain, but it may be of Sami origin, meaning "small mountains".

Coat of arms
The coat of arms was granted on 19 August 1988 and it was used until 1 January 2020 when the municipality was dissolved. The official blazon is "Or an auger drill sable". This means the arms have a field (background) with a tincture of Or which means it is commonly colored yellow, but if it is made out of metal, then gold is used. The charge is an auger with a tincture of sable. The auger was chosen for the design in order to represent boat building, an industry with long roots in the municipality. The arms were designed by Arvid Sveen.

Churches
The Church of Norway had three parishes within the municipality of Skånland. It was part of the Trondenes prosti (deanery) in the Diocese of Nord-Hålogaland.

Economy

Agriculture is important in Skånland, and there are also many people working in Harstad or at the Harstad/Narvik Airport, Evenes.

Geography
The municipality includes the western and northern part of the Ofoten peninsula, which is bordered by Ofotfjord in the south, Tjeldsundet in the west, and the Astafjorden and Vågsfjorden in the north.  Neighbouring municipalities are Evenes to the south, Narvik in the southeast, Tjeldsund in Nordland to the southwest. Harstad in the northwest, across the Tjeldsundet, and Gratangen in the northeast, are located in Troms county.  Evenskjer, located in the lowland bordering the Tjeldsundet strait, is the largest village. In the northern part is the smaller village of Grov. Other villages are Renså, Tovik and Sandstrand.

There are calcareous pine forests near Skoddebergvatnet. The lake Niingsvatnet is located on the border with Evenes.

Climate

Government
Skånland municipality (prior to its dissolution in 2020) was responsible for primary education (through 10th grade), outpatient health services, senior citizen services, unemployment and other social services, zoning, economic development, and municipal roads. The municipality was governed by a municipal council of elected representatives, which in turn elected a mayor.  The municipality fell under the Trondenes District Court and the Hålogaland Court of Appeal.

Municipal council
The municipal council  of Skånland was made up of 15 representatives that were elected to four year terms. The party breakdown of the final municipal council was as follows:

Mayors
The mayors of Skånland:

1926-1945: Albert Isaksen 
1945-1945: Tonning Larsen 
1946-1947: Robert Mathisen 		
1948-1958: Martin Svendsen
1958-1959: Sigvart Isaksen
1960-1963: Herleif Grøneng 
1964-1967: Peder Ellefsen 		
1968-1975: Herleif Grøneng 
1976-1979: Aage Olsen 
1980-1991: Odd Nilssen (Ap)
1992-1997: Håkon Walter Brox (H)
1997-2002: Terje Fjordbakk (Sp)
2002-2011: Svein Berg (Ap)
2011–2015: Einar Aune (H)
2015–2019: Helene Berg Nilsen (Ap)

See also
List of former municipalities of Norway

References

External links
Municipal fact sheet from Statistics Norway 

 
Tjeldsund
Former municipalities of Norway
1926 establishments in Norway
2020 disestablishments in Norway
Populated places disestablished in 2020